In mathematical physics, the Degasperis–Procesi equation

 

is one of only two exactly solvable equations in the following family of third-order, non-linear, dispersive PDEs:

where  and b are real parameters (b=3 for the Degasperis–Procesi equation). It was discovered by Degasperis and Procesi in a search for integrable equations similar in form to the Camassa–Holm equation, which is the other integrable equation in this family (corresponding to b=2); that those two equations are the only integrable cases has been verified using a variety of different integrability tests. Although discovered solely because of its mathematical properties, the Degasperis–Procesi equation (with ) has later been found to play a similar role in water wave theory as the Camassa–Holm equation.

Soliton solutions 

Among the solutions of the Degasperis–Procesi equation (in the special case ) are the so-called multipeakon solutions, which are functions of the form

where the functions  and  satisfy

These ODEs can be solved explicitly in terms of elementary functions, using inverse spectral methods.

When  the soliton solutions of the Degasperis–Procesi equation are smooth; they converge to peakons in the limit as  tends to zero.

Discontinuous solutions 

The Degasperis–Procesi equation (with ) is formally equivalent to the (nonlocal) hyperbolic conservation law

where , and where the star denotes convolution with respect to x.
In this formulation, it admits weak solutions with a very low degree of regularity, even discontinuous ones (shock waves). By the Sobolev embedding theorem, this means in particular that the weak solutions of the Camassa–Holm equation must be continuous with respect to x.

Notes

References

Further reading 

Mathematical physics
Solitons
Partial differential equations
Equations of fluid dynamics